Pablo Paredes Arratia (born 11 February 1983) is a Spanish footballer who plays for Amurrio Club mainly as a central midfielder.

Club career
Born in Laudio, Álava, Basque Country, Paredes joined Athletic Bilbao's youth setup in 1999, aged 16. He made his debut with the farm team in the 2001–02 campaign, in Tercera División.

In June 2003 Paredes was promoted to the reserves, in Segunda División B. He played his first match as a professional on 2 July 2005, starting in a 0–1 away loss against CFR Cluj, in that year's UEFA Intertoto Cup.

Paredes was released by the Lions in May 2006, and moved to Barakaldo CF in the third level. After appearing sparingly he joined fourth level Amurrio Club, appearing regularly during his two-year spell.

In the summer of 2009, Paredes signed for Sestao River Club in the third division. An undisputed starter, he appeared in 33 matches as his side were relegated.

Paredes moved to fourth tier club CD Laudio on 12 June 2010. In August 2012 he joined fellow league team SD Leioa, achieving promotion back to the third level in 2013–14.

References

External links

1983 births
Living people
Sportspeople from Álava
Spanish footballers
Footballers from the Basque Country (autonomous community)
Association football midfielders
Segunda División B players
Tercera División players
CD Basconia footballers
Bilbao Athletic footballers
Barakaldo CF footballers
Sestao River footballers
CD Laudio players
SD Leioa players
Athletic Bilbao footballers